Spectrum Center is an indoor arena located in Uptown Charlotte, North Carolina. It is owned by the city of Charlotte and operated by its main tenant, the NBA's Charlotte Hornets. The arena seats 19,077 for NBA games but can be expanded to 20,200 for college basketball games.

History
The arena opened in October 2005 as Charlotte Bobcats Arena.  The name was changed to Time Warner Cable Arena when the naming rights were purchased in 2008. When Charter Communications purchased Time Warner Cable in 2016, the name was again changed to reflect the Spectrum trade name.

The arena was originally intended to host the original Hornets franchise in the early 2000s. The Hornets' arena, the Charlotte Coliseum, was considered outdated despite being only 13 years old.

In 2001, a non-binding public referendum for an arts package, which included money to build the new uptown arena, was placed on the ballot for voters; it was placed in order to demonstrate what was believed to be widespread public support for new arena construction. Polls showed the referendum on its way to passage until then-mayor Pat McCrory vetoed a living wage ordinance just days before the referendum. As a result, Helping Empower Local People, a grass-roots organization supporting a living wage, launched a campaign to oppose the arena, arguing that it was immoral for the city to build a new arena when city workers didn't earn enough to make a living. The referendum failed with 43% for building the arena and 57% opposed.

City leaders then devised a way to build a new arena that did not require voter support, but let it be known that they wouldn't consider building it unless then-Hornets' owner George Shinn sold the team. While even the NBA acknowledged that Shinn had alienated fans, NBA officials felt such a statement would anger other team owners. As it turned out, the NBA approved the Hornets' application to move to New Orleans.  However, the league promised that the city would get a new team—which became the Bobcats—as part of the deal. The total cost of the arena to Charlotte and Mecklenburg County was not known, but estimated at around $260 million. The construction was approved by the city council, which did not opt to present another referendum to the public.

The arena opened as the Charlotte Bobcats Arena on October 21, 2005, costing $265 million. Architects hoped the building would bring the city together, as its location and large outdoor plaza, among other features, would suggest. The building's concourses and open design, plus artwork throughout also suggests the concept of community and socializing. One major feature of the arena was its original center-hung scoreboard, which was not only the largest scoreboard in any NBA arena when it debuted, but also featured a one-of-a-kind light-up 360 degree 3D mural of the Charlotte skyline. In early 2006, the arena became the subject of controversy when the Bobcats charged a $15,000 fee to Charlotte-Mecklenburg Schools for graduation ceremonies held at the building. The fee was eventually waived following media attention from a local newspaper. Many high schools in the area moved graduations to Bojangles' Coliseum.

As part of the deal, TWC shuttered its poorly-performing regional sports network C-SET (which was established to serve as the Bobcats' rightsholder) and allowed the team to negotiate a new deal with Fox Sports South to ensure wider distribution of its games. Following Charter Communications' purchase of TWC, the arena was renamed Spectrum Center, in accordance with Charter's trade name for its cable services.

Renovations 
In September 2014, the Charlotte city council agreed to give the Hornets $34 million for arena renovations in preparation for the 2017 NBA All-Star Game. (However, the game was moved to New Orleans because of a controversial HB2 bill, but Spectrum Center did host the 2019 NBA All-Star Game to make up for it.)

On January 24, 2015, the Hornets announced and unveiled images of a new scoreboard to be installed in summer 2016, costing $7 million. The board's screens measure out at 25' high by 42' wide and 18' high by 31' wide, approximately, making it almost twice the size of the original board and among the NBA's largest. The screens are able to handle 1080p resolution, something unique to the  NBA. Two smaller "underbelly" screens would also be included. In addition, the scoreboard would be able to change colors and have a visible 'hive' motif built-in throughout its design. It was also announced that four retractable auxiliary scoreboards will be installed in the corners of the upper level and finally, 360° ribbon boards are scheduled to be installed as well. Construction was completed by the start of the 2016–17 NBA season. Also announced were plans for the renovation of the visitors locker room, suites, and other rooms. This marked the first major renovations to the Spectrum Center in its history.

The city proposed a $245 million renovation plan for both the arena and the area around it in early 2022. It included various internal upgrades to the arena such as new HVAC units, and the possibility of an outdoor space for entertainment similar to others found at NBA arenas. The biggest addition would be a separate new practice facility located across the street from the arena. In addition, the cost would also cover upgrades to the existing transit station where the new facility would be. City leaders approved the renovations, now priced at $275 million, in June 2022. Construction is expected to start in summer 2022 with a rough completion date in 2027.

Major events

College basketball
As North Carolina is a hotbed for college basketball thanks to constant success among its major universities, it was expected that the arena would host many NCAA basketball games, and that expectation was correct. Notable NCAA basketball games the Spectrum Center has hosted to date include:

NCAA tournament: 2008, 2011, 2015, 2018 
The arena hosted the first ever 16–1 upset in the NCAA Tournament since the 64-team field was adopted. The University of Maryland, Baltimore County upset the University of Virginia 74–54 on March 16, 2018.
ACC men's basketball tournament: 2008, 2019
Southern Conference men's basketball tournament: 2010
Central Intercollegiate Athletic Association (CIAA) men's and women's basketball tournaments: 2006–2020.
The Charlotte 49ers basketball teams play a number of high-profile games at the arena.

Other events
In 2012, the Spectrum Center hosted the Democratic National Convention. In 2016, the arena hosted the Kellogg's Tour of Gymnastics Champions. It was scheduled to host the 2017 NBA All-Star Game, but was removed as host on July 21, 2016, due to the league's opposition against North Carolina's Public Facilities Privacy & Security Act signed by then-Governor Pat McCrory. The league said consideration for Charlotte to host in 2019 would remain if the North Carolina State Legislature and current Governor Roy Cooper made changes to the act that were satisfactory to the league. On May 24, 2017, Charlotte and the arena were officially announced as hosts of the 2019 NBA All-Star Game. The arena was originally scheduled to host the 2020 Republican National Convention, but due to the COVID-19 pandemic the event was scaled back with Day 1 events taking place at the Charlotte Convention Center and the remainder of the convention being held virtually.

Tenants
Spectrum Center has had two other permanent tenants besides the Hornets.

The Charlotte Checkers of the ECHL vacated historic Bojangles' Coliseum to play in the new arena in fall 2005. When the ECHL Checkers gave way to an American Hockey League team with the same name, they remained at the arena. Although primarily built for basketball, the arena can accommodate an NHL-sized ice hockey rink. The seating capacity for hockey was 14,100 in an asymmetrical seating arrangement, with much of the upper level curtained off. This resulted in many seats with poor sightlines; over 4,000 seats in the hockey configuration had obstructed views. Primarily because of those factors, on December 16, 2014, it was announced the Checkers would move back to Bojangles' Coliseum starting with the 2015–16 AHL season. Overall, both incarnations of the Checkers played 10 seasons at the arena.

The WNBA's Charlotte Sting moved with the then-Bobcats to the arena in 2005, becoming the building's third permanent tenant. However, they only played one season at their new home in 2006 before folding in early 2007. This was due to low attendance and a lack of on-court success.

Entertainment
The arena is used for more than just sporting events. Musical acts, family productions and other events including concerts, circuses, and professional wrestling all perform there.

In film and television
One Tree Hill location shoot for the season six finale, "Remember Me as a Time of Day". Aired on May 18, 2009.
American Idol Season 12 auditions, June 19, 2012.
The series finale of Veep is primarily set in this venue.

Gallery

References

External links

2005 establishments in North Carolina
Basketball venues in North Carolina
Charlotte 49ers basketball venues
Charlotte Checkers
Charlotte Hornets venues
Charlotte Sting venues
College basketball venues in the United States
Event venues established in 2005
Gymnastics venues in the United States
Indoor ice hockey venues in the United States
National Basketball Association venues
Rodeo venues in the United States
Sports venues completed in 2005
Sports venues in Charlotte, North Carolina